The Vestavia Hills City School System is the school system of the Birmingham, Alabama, suburb of Vestavia Hills. Vestavia Hills City Schools serve 6,762 students and employ 765 faculty and staff. The district includes five elementary schools, two middle schools, and one high school.

Student Profile 
Vestavia Hills City Schools serve all students living within Vestavia Hills city limits. The student population is 83% white, 8% African-American, 5% Asian, and 3% Hispanic. Surrounding Jefferson County is 53% White 42% Black and 1.4% Asian. Approximately 10% of students qualify for free or reduced price lunch, a proxy for poverty. Two percent are English Language Learners (ELL), and 7% have Individualized Education Programs.

Vestavia Hills City Schools have an overall graduation rate of 99%. Approximately 95% of Vestavia Hills students meet or exceed state proficiency standards in mathematics, and about 97% meet or exceed standards in reading.

Schools 
The system consists of nine schools: five elementary schools, two middle schools, a ninth grade campus, and one high school.

Elementary schools 
 Vestavia Hills Elementary East
 Vestavia Hills Elementary West
 Vestavia Hills Elementary Cahaba Heights
 Vestavia Hills Elementary Liberty Park
 Vestavia Hills Elementary Dolly Ridge

Middle schools 
 Louis Pizitz Middle School
 Liberty Park Middle School

High schools 
 Vestavia Hills Freshman Campus
 Vestavia Hills High School

Mascot Controversy 
In the wake of the Charleston church shooting in June 2015, The Birmingham News highlighted this racially charged history and called for a removal of the Vestavia Hills mascot, the Rebel Man, which resembled the same mascot used by the University of Mississippi until 2003. Meanwhile, the school superintendent called it 'a "point of contention for some members" of the community.' By early July 2015, some Vestavia Hills residents wrote an op-ed in The Birmingham News calling on the school board to change its name. By the middle of July 2015, comedian John Oliver made fun of the claim that it was "heritage, not hate" on national television. He argued, "Your logo is a plantation owner. [...] And saying that the image of a plantation owner is not used in a racist way is a bit like arguing the Hitachi magic wand is only used as a back massager."

The Vestavia Hills School System decided to keep the Rebels name but initiate a "rebranding" process.

As of the 2016-2017 school year, the Rebel Man mascot is no longer being used by the high school.

References

External links
 

Education in Jefferson County, Alabama
School districts in Alabama
1970 establishments in Alabama
School districts established in 1970